Eddie Hobbs (born 10 November 1962) is an Irish financial advisor, writer, campaigner and former television presenter and author. 

Hobbs was a co-founder and former president of the right-wing party Renua Ireland, resigning in 2016.

Before entering politics, Hobbs was known for his presenting on RTÉ shows such as Give or Take Club,  Rip-Off Republic, Show Me the Money and 30 Things to do with your SSIA.

Hobbs is the director of Hobbs Financial Practice ltd, a financial services firm.

Brendan Investments, a fund co-founded by Hobbs in 2007 from which he resigned as non-executive director in early 2015, was subject to media scrutiny after he left the company in 2017 when it was reported the fund had lost 90% of its investor's money.

Financial career

Hobbs worked for Zurich Life from 1979 to 1991, and left his position as Marketing Manager to set up a fee-based financial planning company TIPS. In March 1993 Hobbs published a report "Endowment Mortgages The Hometruth", which collapsed sales of endowment home-loans in Ireland by June 1993 after the banking and life insurance industry failed to deal with his critique. In 1995 Hobbs was made a non-executive director in the financial services firm Taylor Asset Management but resigned from it and TIPS in January 1996. In May 1996 after a two-month investigation, Hobbs lodged a complaint with the Irish regulator about the handling of two client files by Tony Taylor CEO of the Taylor Group. Tony Taylor fled Ireland and was located living under an alias in Eastbourne UK in 1999 by an investigator reporting to Hobbs. Taylor was extradited and pleaded guilty to five counts of fraud, forgery and destruction of documents for which he was sentenced to five years in prison. Hobbs himself was never implicated in any issues relating to company affairs and in 2007 he was exonerated by the Irish High Court and praised by the presiding judge for showing "efficiency and determination and for not standing idly" when he pursued Taylor's activities from 1995 to 1996.

He published a report after obtaining Irish data on saving policy lapse rates captured in a UK Government study and proved that one in three Irish savers lost 100% of their contributions and that another one in three got back less than they put in.

Consequently, in 1996 he submitted a complaint to The Competition Authority alleging that the Government supported Irish Insurance Federation Remuneration Agreement was offensive to competition law since 1991, had engendered a culture of consensus decision-making, restricted competition and prevented costs and commission disclosure to consumers. The complaint was upheld in 1998 forcing the Government to introduce statutory commission and charges disclosure and transform the consumer experience. The Life industry was forced to reissue its product range to comply with the Insurance Act 2000. Hobbs acted in a voluntary capacity as a director and Finance spokesperson for The Consumers association of Ireland from 1993 to 2006. He has qualifications in accounting, finance and financial planning. Hobbs' complaint to the EU Taxation Commission that the Irish tax code was being adjusted to create competitive advantage to domestic Irish funds in breach of The Treaty of Rome, resulted in the Commission writing to Finance Minister McCreevy who adjusted the new gross roll-up tax regime to all OECD funds. When Minister McCreevy announced the SSIA savings scheme, Hobbs launched the Consumers Association of Ireland 'Savermark' standard that required banks to link deposit interest to the ECB base rate movements to prevent margins widening. Over €10bn in savings went into tracker deposit accounts.  Hobbs accused the Life Insurance industry of colluding to avoid the 'Savermark' pricing and called for a Competition Authority investigation.

Television career
He presented the RTÉ show Rip-Off Republic in 2005, a show preoccupied with artificially high development land prices, the perceived high personal taxes, corporate margins and cartels/monopolies in Ireland. (The term 'Ripoff Republic' was first used in an article in The Irish Independent in 2003 by consumer affairs journalist Eddie Lennon). In it Hobbs claimed, in a reference to land prices and inflated costs that "Ireland was eating its young". In Rip Off Republic Hobbs advised consumers to post nappies to the Dept of Enterprise Trade & Employment to object to the Groceries Order 1987 because nappies were listed as a grocery and the Act made it an offence for retailers to pass through discounts from manufacturers. Thousands of nappies were posted and the Groceries Order was repealed by Government 2005.

Prior to this, Hobbs presented the television show Show Me the Money, where he helped various people, from farmers to hairdressers, to improve their finances and which won two IFTA TV awards. He has also presented a three-part programme, 30 Things to do with your SSIA, in which he gives a humorous list of ideas for spending the money held in a Special Savings Incentive Account (SSIA). Notably he advised people against investing their SSIAs, along with borrowed bank money, in Irish Investment Property (RIPS) and explained investment in property PLCs as a better choice. He outlined Minsky's bubble theory and suggested the Irish market was at the latter steps of it. In Show Me the Money he repeatedly advised since 2004 that property prices in Ireland are only going down, and strongly advised against residential investment property purchase in Ireland. In 2007 Irish property prices started to reverse. An outspoken populist critic of the vested interests in Ireland, especially the producer groups who "control the country", Hobbs has often repeated that "There's one game in town: development." He spoke out against Jumbo mortgages. In his 2006 book, LOOT, he advised readers to reduce debt to under 50% of assets, move to AAA rated banks, exit equities, buy bonds and own some gold, two years later the global financial crisis emerged.

During the run up to the 2007 Irish general election, Hobbs and his colleague Matt Cooper presented a political programme called Polls Apart on Irish TV station TV3, in which they interview the main Irish political party leaders about what they intend to do after the election, if they were to be elected into government.

He co-presented RTÉ's The Consumer Show from 2010 to 2012. He quit the show in 2012 after concerns of being 'stifled'. He regularly appears in media debates on the nature of the Irish economic austerity policy heavily critical of the cross subsidisation of the public sector and inaction in dealing with Irish consumer insolvency. He presented My Civil War, a social history TV programme on the Irish Civil War with RTÉ's documentary unit. In November 2013 he presented an hour long pilot of 'The Give or Take Club' an experiment in social co-operation based in a rural town in a joint venture between Endemol, RTÉ, Independent Pictures and the presenter.

Other work

Writer
In 2004 he released Short Hands Long Pockets his first book as a fund raiser for The Jack & Jill Children's Foundation for whom he acts as patron since 2005. His second book LOOT! was published in 2006. Each book was a best seller. In March 2009, Hobbs released his third book, Debt Busters by Currach Press.

During the 2020 lockdown, he commenced work on a historical fiction novel, The First Heresy, announced by Liberties Press to be published in February 2022.

Journalism
From 2007 to 2010 he acted an editorial director of monthly magazine You & Your Money owned and published by Ashville Publications. He wrote weekly columns for The Daily Star, Sunday Independent and Sunday Business Post. In October 2009 he launched Energise – How to Survive and Prosper in the Coming Age of Scarcity, High Inflation and Peak Oil as an eBook from his website, all profits from which go to the Irish children's charity, The Jack & Jill Foundation. He is a frequent commentator and writer on social, economic and financial affairs on Irish TV, radio and newspapers. Hobbs campaigned against Government appropriation of private pension savings, encouraging savers to instruct pension trustees that they had no authority as custodians to meet Revenue Commissioners' demands, resulting in the Finance Act, which provided for a €380 fine for Trustees for every day the levy payment was delayed. Hobbs directed the letter campaign to urge then-President McAleese to refer the Act to the Supreme Court on the basis that it was not taxing legislation but interference with property rights. The Irish President signed the Finance Act into law. The total taken in the pension levy to 2015 is estimated at €2bn.

In a controversial 2012 article in The Wall Street Journal, Hobbs described the Irish Government as a captive: "So while Time magazine and others eulogize the plucky leader of the Irish people, the truth is that Enda Kenny leads a Vichy government—captive externally to creditors that still insist on loading bank debt onto the sovereign, and internally to a tribe of insiders led by union godfathers in a deal that protects the government's own excessive pay and pensions while bankers lean over its shoulders to rewrite insolvency laws. This isn't just crony capitalism. It's crony democracy".

Hobbs miscalculated the slump in demand in developed economies, especially in Europe. Fearing that money printing operations would lead to an inflation break out, he advised mortgage holders with high debt to income to buy certainty and fix rates. He was wrong; after initially raising rates, the ECB was forced to cut them to historic lows. In 2007 as a non-executive director he helped launch Brendan Investments Plc, a ten-year collective investment in European property for smaller investors, after obtaining Central Bank approval as the first retail investment product to comply with the EU Prospectus Directive. The intake at under €13m fell short of expectations and although entering the stable German commercial property market, the vehicle was set back by early loses when its anchor tenant, Germany's largest retail group Arcandor went into liquidation during the banking crisis and by restricted bank credit. He retired as a non-Executive Director 2015 when he was appointed a President of a new political party, Renua. Two and a half years later the company was liquidated after experiencing heavy losses in the Detroit housing refurbishing market following a valuation slump in 2016 -2019 caused by a lead water crisis that erupted in Flint to the north.

Politics

In the spring of 2015, Hobbs was a co-founder of Renua, a new political party formed by breakaway members of Fine Gael, most prominently Lucinda Creighton who served as its first leader.<ref name="Renua launch Indo"></</ref> As part of the party's formal launch on 13 March 2015, Hobbs appeared alongside Creighton on a segment on The Late Late Show to explain what the party stood for. On the day there was initial confusion about whether Hobbs would stand as a Renua candidate in the forthcoming 2016 Irish general election, with Hobbs downplaying the prospect but Renua's official website listing him as a candidate. Ultimate, Hobbs never did stand for the party but acted as the party's president from its launch until June 2016.       

Hobbs resigned from Renua in June 2016 after the party failed to get any its candidates elected in 2016, including its leader Lucinda Creighton, despite securing 2.5% of the vote and Government funding, one of its key targets. During his time as party president, Hobbs has claimed he attempted to get the party to alter its positioning from being a socially conservative party to a Liberal Democratic one in the same vein as the UK's Liberal Democrats. However, Hobbs felt his efforts were futile as the vast majority of members for the party were those who joined on the belief that Renua would be, either explicitly or subtly, an anti-abortion party. Hobbs has also claimed he wanted to make a key plank of the party that they would advocate for using a Social Progress Index instead of GDP.     

In 2019 Hobbs fundraised and sponsored a paper from Professor Cal Muckley of University College Dublin advocating for a Social Progress Index for Ireland. It was launched in Feb 2020 and adopted by the Irish Business and Employers Confederation and Irish Small and Medium Enterprise Association as key policies, later becoming the opening feature in the Programme for Government by the Fine Gael Fianna Fail and Green coalition.

In March 2022, Hobbs described his political orientation as a "Radical centrist".

Awards and posts held
 

Hobbs was appointed by the Irish Government as a Director of the National Consumer Agency in 2007 having served on its interim board since 2005. Hobbs was criticised in 2008 by the Irish Independent for poor attendance of NCA board meetings, which he acknowledged and blamed on poor scheduling. Hobbs redesigned from the NCA in 2009, citing his discomfort with a loan given to another board member as well unhappiness with Minister for Enterprise Mary Coughlan, whom the NCA reported to. 

In 2013 Hobbs helped set up Own Our Oil, a citizens advocacy group focused on overhauling Ireland's oil and gas licensing regime, and made a pre-Budget submission in July 2013 calling for the sale of licences to be treated like development land rezoning, and subject to Capital Gains Tax of 66% to recover economic rents to the Irish people. In March 2014 Hobbs launched Own Our Oil – the Fight for Ireland's Economic Freedom, a compilation of essays from a multi-discipline team of writers covering, planning, environment, taxation, strategy, industry, geology, and history, commencing a national public briefing campaign. During the Irish Water controversy Hobbs has called for the redrafting of Article 10 of the Irish Constitution to return the ownership of all natural resources to The Irish People from ownership by The State which it took in the 1937 Constitution, reducing the State role to a trustee required to act in the common good but justiciable through the Courts when in breach of its duties. This was a move designed to alienate the ability of the State to sell off natural resources, including water to preserve itself during future crises.

Vaccination Passports controversy
On 29 June 2021, Hobbs tweeted "badges so the terrified can identify the unvaccinated among us"; the tweet included a Star of David. The Auschwitz-Birkenau State Museum replied that comparing the Holocaust to COVID-19 vaccines "that saves human lives is a sad symptom of moral and intellectual decline". Hobbs deleted the initial tweet and in response tweeted "Vaccine Passports instead of antigen testing is morally the wrong move", describing it as a "slippery slope". He campaigned intensively using Twitter on two issues, the use of vaccine passports to segregate Irish people and vaccinating healthy children at lower risk to Covid than to the vaccines.

References

External links
 
 

1962 births
20th-century Irish people
21st-century Irish people
Living people
Irish financial businesspeople
Irish television personalities
People from County Cork
RTÉ television presenters
Renua Ireland politicians
People educated at Coláiste Chríost Rí